Acacia gilesiana, commonly known as Gile's wattle, is a shrub of the genus Acacia and the subgenus Plurinerves that is endemic to arid parts of southern Australia.

Description
Like most species of Acacia it has phyllodes rather than true leaves. It blooms from July to August and produces yellow flowers.

Taxonomy
The specific epithet, gilesiana, honours William Ernest Powell Giles (explorer and botanical collector).

Distribution
It is native to an area in the Goldfields-Esperance region of Western Australia, and in South Australia in the Nullarbor region near Maralinga and the north-western region. It is often situated on sand dunes or sandplains growing in red sandy soils. The range of the species extends from the Gibson Desert in the north west and the Great Victoria Desert in the south west from around Neale Junction extending eastward to Maralinga in South Australia where it is found as a part of low open woodland and tall shrubland communities often in association with mulga and spinifex.

See also
 List of Acacia species

References

gilesiana
Acacias of Western Australia
Taxa named by Ferdinand von Mueller
Flora of South Australia